The 132nd Field Artillery Regiment "Ariete" is a field artillery regiment of the Italian Army, specializing in armored combat. Today the regiment is based in Maniago in Friuli-Venezia Giulia and operationally assigned to the 132nd Armored Brigade "Ariete".

History 
The 132nd Armored Artillery Regiment was raised in Rovereto on 1 February 1939 and assigned to the 132nd Armored Division "Ariete".

The regiment was raised by the depot of the 4th Army Corps Artillery Regiment and consisted initially of the following units:

 Regimental Command
 Command Unit
 I Group, with 75/27 Mod. 1906 field guns
 II Group, with 75/27 Mod. 1906 field guns
 2× 20mm Anti-aircraft batteries
 Regimental Depot

The regiment's two groups were transferred from the 4th Army Corps Artillery Regiment and the 5th Army Corps Artillery Regiment. The regiment was commanded by Colonel Domenico Chieli Menotti and began grow its personnel by recalling personnel from the 1910-1917 classes and adding new conscripts from the 1918 and 1919 classes. The regiment continued artillery training and maneuver exercises with the rest of the 132nd Armored Division "Ariete".

World War II 

In World War II the 132nd Armored Division "Ariete" was sent to Libya to participate in the Western Desert Campaign. The division and its regiments were destroyed on 21 November 1942 during the Second Battle of El Alamein. For their sacrifice the regiments of the division were rewarded with a Gold Medal of Military Valour.

Cold War 

The regiment was reconstituted on 15 May 1949 as 132nd Armored Artillery Regiment and assigned to the reconstituted Armored Division "Ariete".

During the 1975 army reform the army disbanded the regimental level and newly independent battalions were given for the first time their own flags. On 31 December 1975 the 132nd Armored Artillery Regiment was disbanded and on the same day the regiment's IV Heavy Self-propelled Field Artillery Group in Casarsa della Delizia was renamed 132nd Heavy Self-propelled Field Artillery Group "Rovereto" and assigned the flag and traditions of the 132nd Armored Artillery Regiment. The 132nd Regiment's staff was used to form the Armored Division "Ariete"'s Divisional Artillery Command.

In March 1981 the 132nd "Rovereto" was equipped with FH70 towed howitzers and therefore renamed 132nd Heavy Field Artillery Group "Rovereto". On 30 September 1986 the Armored Division "Ariete" was disbanded and the 132nd "Rovereto" was assigned to the 5th Army Corps' Artillery Command.

In March 1991 the 132nd Heavy Field Artillery Group "Rovereto" was assigned to the 5th Heavy Artillery Regiment, which also contained the 5th Heavy Field Artillery Group "Superga". On 31 March 1993 the 132nd Heavy Field Artillery Group "Rovereto" was disbanded.

On 9 October of the same year the 132nd Self-propelled Field Artillery Regiment "Ariete" was reformed by renaming the 19th Self-propelled Field Artillery Group "Rialto", which had been the artillery group of the 132nd Armored Brigade "Ariete" since the 8th Mechanized Brigade "Garibaldi" was transferred to Southern Italy on 1 July 1991. In 2000 the regiment assumed its current name.

Current Structure

As of 2022 the 132nd Field Artillery Regiment "Ariete" consists of:

  Regimental Command, in Maniago
 Command and Logistic Support Battery "Tobruk"
 Surveillance, Target Acquisition and Tactical Liaison Battery "Ain el Gazala"
 1st Self-propelled Group "El Alamein"
 1st Howitzer Battery "Rughet el Atasc"
 2nd Howitzer Battery "Bir Hacheim"
 3rd Howitzer Battery "El Mechili"
 Fire and Technical Support Battery 

The Command and Logistic Support Battery fields the following sections: C3 Section, Transport and Materiel Section, Medical Section, and Commissariat Section. The regiment is equipped with PzH 2000 self-propelled howitzers. The Surveillance, Target Acquisition and Tactical Liaison Battery is equipped with RQ-11B Raven unmanned aerial vehicles and ARTHUR counter-battery radars.

Military honors 
After World War II the President of Italy awarded the 132nd Field Artillery Regiment "Ariete" Italy's highest military honor, the Gold Medal of Military Valour for the regiment's conduct and sacrifice during the Western Desert Campaign:

  Western Desert Campaign, awarded 15 March 1950

See also 
 132nd Armored Brigade "Ariete"

External links
Italian Army Website: 132° Reggimento Artiglieria Terrestre "Ariete"

References

Artillery Regiments of Italy